Aphrosylus is a genus of flies in the family Dolichopodidae. All species are intertidal in habitat.

Species

Aphrosylus aculeatus Negrobov, 1979
Aphrosylus aguellinus Vaillant, 1955
Aphrosylus argyreatus Frey, 1945
Aphrosylus atlanticus Dahl, 1960
Aphrosylus beckeri Parent, 1927
Aphrosylus calcarator Frey, 1945
Aphrosylus canariensis Santos Abreu, 1929
Aphrosylus celtiber Haliday, 1855
Aphrosylus cilifemoratus Rampini, 1982
Aphrosylus dytei Olejnicek & Bartak, 2004
Aphrosylus ferox Haliday, 1851
Aphrosylus fumipennis Van Duzee, 1924
Aphrosylus fur Parent, 1928
Aphrosylus fuscipennis Strobl, 1909
Aphrosylus gioiellae Rampini & Munari, 1987
Aphrosylus giordanii Rampini & Munari, 1987
Aphrosylus jacquemini Vaillant, 1950
Aphrosylus jucundus Becker, 1908
Aphrosylus lindbergi Frey, 1958
Aphrosylus madeirensis Frey, 1949
Aphrosylus maroccanus Vaillant, 1955
Aphrosylus mitis Verrall, 1912
Aphrosylus occultus Becker, 1908
Aphrosylus parcearmatus Parent, 1925
Aphrosylus piscator Lichtwardt, 1902
Aphrosylus raptor Haliday, 1851
Aphrosylus rossii Rampini, 1982
Aphrosylus salensis Grootaert & Van de Velde, 2019
Aphrosylus schumanni Negrobov, 1979
Aphrosylus temaranus Vaillant, 1955
Aphrosylus tenuipes Van Duzee, 1924
Aphrosylus venator Loew, 1857

Aphrosylus griseatus Curran, 1926 is a synonym of Cemocarus griseatus (Curran, 1926), the type species of Cemocarus.

The following species were moved to Paraphrosylus:
Aphrosylus californicus Harmston, 1952
Aphrosylus direptor Wheeler, 1897
Aphrosylus grassator Wheeler, 1897
Aphrosylus nigripennis Van Duzee, 1924
Aphrosylus praedator Wheeler, 1897
Aphrosylus wirthi Harmston, 1951

The following species were moved to Cymatopus:
Aphrosylus setosus Curran, 1932

References 

Dolichopodidae genera
Hydrophorinae
Taxa named by Alexander Henry Haliday
Diptera of Africa
Diptera of Europe
Diptera of North America